Xyris elliottii, common name Elliott's yelloweyed grass, is a North American species of flowering plant in the yellow-eyed-grass family. It is native to the coastal plain of the United States from Mississippi to South Carolina plus southern Mexico (Tabasco), Central America (Belize, Nicaragua) and the West Indies (Cuba, Puerto Rico).

Xyris elliottii is a perennial herb up to 25 cm (10 inches) tall with grass-like, olive-green leaves up to 40 cm (4 inches) long, and yellow flowers.

References

External links
Photo of herbarium specimen at Missouri Botanical Garden, collected in British Honduras (Belize) in 1970

elliottii
Plants described in 1860
Flora of the Southeastern United States
Flora of Central America
Flora of Tabasco
Flora of the Caribbean
Taxa named by Alvan Wentworth Chapman